Grebaštica is a village in Šibenik-Knin County, Croatia. It is located by the Adriatic Sea, 15 km south of Šibenik and 15 km north of 
Primošten.
The main economic activity is tourism.

Main sights 
Except beaches, there are other sights worth visiting. The natural water spring – Kanela is located in the upper part of village, called "Gornja Grebaštica".
The defensive wall or often called "the Chinese wall" on the peninsula of Oštrica was built in 1497. The wall was built for the purpose of defense in the Croatian–Ottoman wars.

Image gallery

References

Populated places in Šibenik-Knin County